Molima is an Austronesian language spoken in the D'Entrecasteaux Islands of Papua New Guinea.

Phonology

Consonants 

 , when preceding a vowel, may also be realized as a semivowel .

Vowels

References 

Nuclear Papuan Tip languages
Languages of Milne Bay Province
D'Entrecasteaux Islands